The 1990 FIBA Europe Under-18 Championship was an international basketball  competition held in the Netherlands in 1990.

Final ranking

1. 

2. 

3. 

4. 

5. 

6. 

7. 

8. 

9. 

10. 

11. 

12.

Awards

External links
FIBA Archive

FIBA U18 European Championship
1990–91 in European basketball
1990 in Dutch sport
International youth basketball competitions hosted by the Netherlands